The Anglican dioceses of Buganda are the Anglican presence in the Central Region, Uganda (equivalent to the old Buganda kingdom); they are part of the Church of Uganda. The remaining dioceses of the Church are in the areas of Eastern Uganda, of Northern Uganda, of Ankole and Kigezi, and of Rwenzori.

Diocese of Namirembe
The first Anglican church structure in what is now Uganda, Kenya, and Tanzania was the Diocese of Eastern Equatorial Africa, which was erected in June 1884. The first bishop was James Hannington, who made the diocesan headquarters at Mombassa, but he was assassinated (martyred) on 8 February 1886. The third Bishop of Eastern Equatorial Africa, Alfred Tucker, resolved to divide the diocese: he stayed on Bishop of Uganda, while Kenya and part of northern Tanganyika became the Diocese of Mombasa; the division was effected in 1898.

From then until 1926 — when the Diocese of Upper Nile was dividing from it — the Diocese of Uganda included all Uganda, Rwanda and Burundi, in what was then the country of Zaire. On 1 July 1960, in preparation for the formation of an independent church province, the diocese was split in five: one of the smaller new dioceses retained the same bishop and became the Diocese of Namirembe (so her bishop became Bishop of Namirembe). After the division, the diocese's territory was East Buganda and Busoga.

Brown was elected to become the first archbishop of the new province and took up the post in 1961, when the eight dioceses were erected into the Church of the Province of Uganda and Ruanda-Urundi. The arrangement whereby the Archbishop was elected ended in 1977, when the Bishop of Kampala became Archbishop ex officio.

Since 1890, throughout its many changes, the diocese's mother church has been St Paul's Cathedral, on Namirembe hill in Kampala. The current building is the fifth Namirembe Cathedral on the same site.

Bishops of Eastern Equatorial Africa
1884–1885: James Hannington
1886–1888: Henry Parker
1890–1899 Alfred Tucker

Bishops of Uganda
1899–1908: Alfred Tucker
1912–1934: John Willis
1934–1953: Cyril Stuart
19471960 (ret.): Aberi Balya, assistant bishop for Tooro, Bunyoro, Ankole and Kigezi
1951–1960: Percy James "Jim" Brazier, assistant bishop for Ruanda-Urundi (became first diocesan Bishop of Ruanda-Urundi; 3 August 190330 November 1989; deaconed 12 June 1927 & priested 3 June 1928 by Cyril Garbett at Southwark; consecrated 2 February 1951 by Geoffrey Fisher (Canterbury) at Westminster)
June 19521960: Festo Lutaya, assistant bishop (became first diocesan of West Buganda)
1953–1960 Leslie Brown
5 May 19571960: Kosiya Shalita, assistant bishop
1 May1 July 1960: Erica Sabiti, assistant bishop

In 1957, preparing for the split into five dioceses, Brown oversaw the creation of five "areas", to be overseen by himself and his four suffragans:
Ruanda-Urundi had already been under Brazier's oversight since 1951
April/May 1957 onwards: Lutaya had the West Buganda area
5 May 1957 onwards: Shalita, for Ankole-Kigezi (became first diocesan Bishop of Ankole-Kigezi)
9 May 1957 onwards: Brown took direct oversight of the East Buganda and Busoga area
16 May 1957before 1 May 1960: Balya was assistant bishop for Toro-Bunyoro until his retirement
1 May 1960 onwards: Sabiti succeeded Balya over Toro-Bunyoro-Mboga (became first bishop diocesan of Rwenzori)

On the split in 1960, the five men became diocesan bishops of their areas.

Bishops of Namirembe
196021 November 1965 (ret.): Leslie Brown, Archbishop of Uganda, Rwanda and Burundi from 1961
21 November 19651985: Dunstan Nsubuga, first indigenous bishop (assistant since 1964)
1985–1994: Misaeri Kauma (assistant bishop 1975–1985)
1994–2009: Samuel Ssekkadde
2009–present: Kityo Luwalira (consecrated and installed 31 May 2009)

Diocese of West Buganda
One of the five dioceses erected in 1960 from the Uganda diocese was that of West Buganda. Lutaya (an assistant bishop) was made the first Bishop of West Buganda; in 1964, he moved the diocesan headquarters from Masaka to his hometown Mityana, which caused trouble in Masaka. The controversy rolled on and delayed Tomusange's enthronement in September 1966.
 Her cathedral has been St Paul's Cathedral, Kako (in Masaka) since before 1974.

Bishops of West Buganda
1960–1965 (ret.): Festo Lutaya
1965–?: Stephen Tomusange (previously an assistant bishop on the Upper Nile)
before 1986before 2001: Christopher Senyonjo
Samuel Ssemakula
23 January 201131 May 2015 (d.): Godfrey Makumbi
28 August 2016present: Henry Katumba Tamale

Diocese of Kampala

Founded in 1972 from Namirembe diocese, the diocesan bishop of Kampala has always been Archbishop of Uganda. (They are never called Archbishop of Kampala; there is a Roman Catholic Archbishop of Kampala.) Because of the archbishop's national duties, there have often been assistant bishops in the diocese; the cathedral is All Saints on Nakasero hill, central Kampala.

Assistant Bishops of Kampala
Assistant bishops have included:
1983–1997: Lucas Gonahasa (previously Assistant Bishop of Bukedi)
2004 (ret.): Eliphaz Maari
30 January 2005June 2012 (ret.): Zac Niringiye
10 December 2006?: David Sebuhinja, assistant for the Provincial Secretariat
2 September 2007?: John Guernsey, bishop for COU congregations in the USA
2014–present: Hannington Mutebi

Diocese of Mityana
Erected from West Buganda and inaugurated on 22 May 1977, the Diocese of Mityana has its bishop's seat at St Andrew's Cathedral, Namukozi.

Bishops of Mityana
19771989: Yokana Mukasa
22 January 1989?: Wilson Mutebi
January 20022008: Dunstan Bukenya
26 October 20082020: Stephen Kaziimba (became Archbishop of Uganda and Bishop of Kampala)
2 February 2020present: James Bukomeko

Diocese of Mukono
Mukono diocese was divided from Namirembe diocese in 1983, when Mpalanyi-Nkoyoyo, an assistant bishop of Namirembe, was elected the new diocese's first bishop. The mother church is SS Andrew & Philip Cathedral, Mukono.

Bishops of Mukono
19831995: Livingstone Mpalanyi Nkoyoyo (previously assistant bishop of Namirembe; became Archbishop of Uganda)
November 1995June 2002 (ret.): Michael Senyimba
30 June 2002September 2010 (ret.): Paul Luzinda
19 September 2010present: James Ssebaggala

Diocese of Luweero
Founded from the Diocese of Namirembe in 1991, the cathedral is St Mark's, Luweero.

Bishops of Luweero
8 December 19911996: Mesusera Bugimbi
1996–2015: Evans Mukasa
17 May 2015present: Eridard Nsubuga

Diocese of Central Buganda
In 1995, the Diocese of Central Buganda was created by splitting territory from the West Buganda diocese. The cathedral is at Kasaka, St John's.

Bishops of Central Buganda
1995–2001: George Sinabulya
2001–2016: Jackson Matovu
29 January 2017present: Micheal Lubowa

See also
 Anglican dioceses of Ankole and Kigezi
 Anglican dioceses of Eastern Uganda
 Anglican dioceses of Northern Uganda
 Anglican dioceses of Rwenzori
 List of Roman Catholic dioceses in Uganda

References

Church of Uganda
Anglican bishops of Uganda